Saxparty 2 is a 1975 Ingmar Nordströms studio album. In 1991, it was rereleased to CD.

Track listing
I Do, I Do, I Do, I Do, I Do
Hej då, ha de' så bra
Natten har tusen ögon (Cuando Sali de Cuba)
Smoke Gets In Your Eyes
La Paloma
Vårt första sommarlov
I'm Leavin' It All Up To You
Soleado (When a Child is Born)
Bing Bong
Alla goda ting är tre (Release Me)
Jag ska fria till Maria
La Novia
En promenad med dej
Michelangelo

Charts

References

1975 albums
Ingmar Nordströms albums